Bruce Willmarth Squires (January 21, 1910, Berkeley, California – May 8, 1981, North Hollywood, California) was an American swing jazz trombonist.

From 1935 to 1937 he was a member of the Ben Pollack band. As Dean and His Kids, they recorded "Spreadin' Knowledge Around/Zoom Zoom Zoom" (Vocalion 1936). Following this he worked with Jimmy Dorsey (1937–38), Gene Krupa (1938–39), Benny Goodman (1939), Harry James (1939–40), Freddie Slack (1940–41), and Bob Crosby (1942). He was a studio musician after World War II and worked in music for the next three decades.

References
Footnotes

General references
John Chilton, Who's Who of Jazz. Da Capo Press, 1985.

1910 births
1981 deaths
American jazz trombonists
Male trombonists
Jazz musicians from California
20th-century American musicians
20th-century trombonists
20th-century American male musicians
American male jazz musicians